John Bunyan Bristol (1826–1909) was an American landscape painter born in Hillsdale, New York.

Career
Self-taught, Bristol studied from nature and originally painted figure and portrait paintings. He abandoned these genres in order to devote his skillful hand to landscape painting. Bristol studied briefly with the painter Henry Ary. He painted from his home in Massachusetts and created highly detailed images which typically combined water and land views. He traveled to Florida in 1859 and produced several tropical pictures which attracted attention to his work. In the 1880s he began to exhibit oil paintings of the norther Adirondacks around Whiteface Mountain and Lake Placid.

Museums
Adirondack Museum

References

Mandel, Patricia C.F. Fair Wilderness: American Paintings in the Collection of The Adirondack Museum. Blue Mountain Lake, New York: The Adirondack Museum, 1990.

External links
Artwork by John Bunyan Bristol

1826 births
1909 deaths
19th-century American painters
People from Hillsdale, New York